Poromecyna is a monotypic beetle genus in the family Cerambycidae described by Per Olof Christopher Aurivillius in 1911. Its only species, Poromecyna foveolata, was described by the same author in the same year.

References

Apomecynini
Beetles described in 1911
Monotypic beetle genera